The 2014 Monza GP2 Series round was a GP2 Series motor race held on September 6 and 7, 2014 at Autodromo Nazionale Monza, Italy. It was the ninenth  round of the 2014 GP2 Series. The race supported the 2014 Italian Grand Prix.

Classification

Qualifying

Feature race

Sprint race

See also 
 2014 Italian Grand Prix
 2014 Monza GP3 Series round

References

Monza
Monza GP2